Hayrettin may refer to:

People
 Hayreddin Barbarossa (ca. 1478 – 1546), Turkish privateer and Ottoman admiral
 Hayrettin Yerlikaya (born 1981), Turkish footballer
 Hakan Hayrettin (born 1970), Turkish/English footballer
 Hayrettin Karaoğuz (born 1984) or just Hayrettin, Turkish comedian.

Places
 Sancaktar Hayrettin Mosque, Mosque in Istanbul
 Gölcük Barbaros Hayrettin Lisesi, public high school in Gölcük, Kocaeli, Turkey
 Kheïr Eddine, a town in Mostaganem Province, Algeria.
 Hayredin, a village in Bulgaria

See also
 Khair ad-Din (disambiguation)
 Hajrudin

Turkish-language surnames
Turkish masculine given names